Robert Ball Watson (November 16, 1930 – June 26, 1999), credited as Bobs Watson, was an American actor and Methodist minister.

Early years

Robert Ball Watson was a member of the Watson Family, famous in the early days of Hollywood as being a houseful of child actors. He was brother to Coy Watson Jr., Harry, Billy, Delmar, Garry, Vivian, Gloria, and Louise, all of whom acted in motion pictures.

The family, known as "the first family of Hollywood", lived by the Echo Park area of Los Angeles and Bobs attended nearby Belmont High School.

Child actor
Watson was best known for his role as "Pee Wee" in the 1938 Metro-Goldwyn-Mayer film Boys Town and its sequel Men of Boys Town (1941), both starring Spencer Tracy and Mickey Rooney. Tracy and Watson became  good friends during the making of the first film, and Watson was reportedly Tracy's last visitor before his death in 1967. In 1939, Watson delivered a fine, tear-jerking performance as Pud, Lionel Barrymore's grandson, in the MGM film, On Borrowed Time.  Watson later made guest appearances in many television programs, including The Twilight Zone, Lou Grant, The Beverly Hillbillies, Green Acres, The Fugitive and Bonanza. In 1963 Watson appeared as Matt Lewis on The Virginian in the episode titled "A Distant Fury."

Later career
In addition to working in the motion pictures business, Watson went to Claremont School of Theology to become a Methodist minister, inspired from the movie Boys Town. He retired after 30 years of serving in Burbank and La Cañada, California.

Later life and death
The Watson family were honored by the Hollywood Chamber of Commerce by placing the Watson family star on the Hollywood Walk of Fame, at 6674 Hollywood Blvd., Hollywood, California.

Watson died of prostate cancer at Laguna Beach, California, on June 26, 1999, at the age of 68.

Filmography

References

Bibliography

 Holmstrom, John (1996). The Moving Picture Boy: An International Encyclopaedia from 1895 to 1995. Norwich: Michael Russell, pp. 171–172.
 Best, Marc (1971). Those Endearing Young Charms: Child Performers of the Screen. South Brunswick and New York: Barnes & Co., pp. 256–259.

External links

 
 

1930 births
1999 deaths
20th-century American clergy
20th-century American male actors
American male child actors
American male film actors
American United Methodist clergy
Deaths from cancer in California
Deaths from prostate cancer
Male actors from Los Angeles
People from Burbank, California
People from La Cañada Flintridge, California
Bobs